Island Press is an Australian publisher of poetry and other interests.

Island Press was founded in 1970 by Canadian poet, musician and Sydney University lecturer Philip Roberts. He lived on Scotland Island at that time, hence the name. In 1973 Philip moved to Bundeena. In the mid-seventies this press was sold to Sydney University where it was used to print diplomas for a few years. In 1979 Philip Roberts returned to Canada and gave Island Press to the "discriminative eye" (Imago, September 1994) of Philip Hammial. Island Press has published more than 50 titles.

Books published include works from Michele Seminara, David Gilbey, Mark Roberts, Lauren Williams, Christine Townend, Jeltje Fanoy, Roberta Lowing, John Watson, Susan Adams, David Musgrave, Barbara De Franceschi, Lizz Murphy, Leith Morton, Philip Hammial, Rae Desmond Jones, Barbara De Francheschi, Les Wicks, David Brooks, Lizz Murphy, Jutta Sieverding, Martin Langford, Leith Morton, Carolyn Gerrish, Rob Reil, Barbara Petrie, Marcelle Freiman, Adam Aitken, J S Harry, Anthony Mannix, Denis Gallagher, John Tranter, Kris Hemensley, Andrew Taylor, Philip Roberts, Ken Bolton, Michael Witts, Keith Shadwick, Andrew Huntley, Robert Adamson, Martin Johnston and Kevin Gilbert.

References
 Cam, H "Reviews" Sydney Morning Herald 11 June 1994
 Gardner, S "Reviews" Imago September 1994
 Island Press website

External links 
 Island Press website
 Philip Roberts on the first 10 years of Island Press
 Martin Langford & Les Wicks on the more recent history of Island Press
 Website of Michael Witts

Publications established in 1970
Australian poetry
Book publishing companies of Australia
1970 establishments in Australia